Binyamin Mizrahi (11 November 1916 – 25 March 2001) was an Israeli footballer who played as a goalkeeper for Maccabi Tel Aviv and Beitar Tel Aviv at club level, and the Mandatory Palestine national team internationally.

Mizrahi took part in Mandatory Palestine's last international match against Lebanon in 1940; it was his only international cap.

References

External links

 Binyamin Mizrahi at maccabipedia.co.il
 

1916 births
2001 deaths
Israeli footballers
Jewish Israeli sportspeople
Association football goalkeepers
Mandatory Palestine footballers
Mandatory Palestine international footballers
Maccabi Tel Aviv F.C. players
Beitar Tel Aviv F.C. players